Stagmatoptera supplicaria is a species of praying mantis in the family Mantidae.

See also
List of mantis genera and species

References

Stagmatoptera
Fauna of the Amazon
Insects described in 1838